Pooth Kalan is a village located, near Sector 20, Rohini in North West district in the Union Territory of Delhi, India. It is basically a Solanki gotra Village inhabited by members of the Jat Community. The word, "kalan"   in Persian means  big . In this village Haryanvi is the mother tongue. Some of the popular shops include : Shiv Dairy,and Ziyaka .

Demographics

 India census, Pooth Kalan had a population of 50,587.Males constitute 55% of the population and females 45%. Pooth Kalan has an average literacy rate of 64%. male literacy is 72%, and female literacy is 56%. In Pooth Kalan, 17% of the population is under 6 years of age.

References

North West Delhi district
Cities and towns in North West Delhi district